The Gnome 7Σ Sigma (commonly called the Gnome 60 hp) is a French seven-cylinder, air-cooled rotary aero engine.

Specifications (7 Sigma)

See also

References

Notes

Bibliography

 Lumsden, Alec. British Piston Engines and their Aircraft. Marlborough, Wiltshire: Airlife Publishing, 2003. .

External links

 Smithsonian/NASM's page on Gnome Omega No.1
 Video of April 2009 ground runup of a restored Gnome Omega in the USA

Air-cooled aircraft piston engines
1900s aircraft piston engines
Sigma
Rotary aircraft piston engines